Jardín Edith Sánchez Ramírez is a pocket park in Colonia Roma, Mexico City. It is located in the triangle formed between calles Yucatán, San Luis Potosí and Tonalá. It is named after Edith Sánchez Ramírez, who was an activist who helped refugees of the 1985 Mexico City earthquake obtain housing. In 2012, the park was in disrepair but it was renovated in 2014, financed by American Eagle Outfitters.

References

Parks in Mexico City
Colonia Roma
Urban renewal
Pocket parks